Cinemais is a cinema chain in Brazil. It operates in 11 cities, with 67 screens.

Screens

 

 External links

 Cinemais official website

Cinema chains in Brazil